The Tour du Sénégal is a stage cycling race held annually in Senegal since 2001. It is rated 2.2 and is part of UCI Africa Tour.

Winners

References

Cycle races in Senegal
2001 establishments in Senegal
Recurring sporting events established in 2001